Tourism in Abruzzo has become one of the most prosperous sectors in the economy of Abruzzo, and in recent years has seen a remarkable growth attracting numerous tourists from Italy and Europe. According to statistics, in 2021 arrivals totaled 1,330,887. A total of 5,197,765 arrivals were tourists, a figure that puts the region seventeenth among the Italian regions for numbers of tourists per year. A moderate support to tourism is also given to the Abruzzo Airport with many low cost and charter flights connecting the entire region with the rest of Europe.

Abruzzo tourism can basically be divided into three different types: mountain tourism hiking natural which includes numerous ski resorts, nature reserves and protected areas, beach tourism and coastal with the number of resort, hotel, camping and beaches, and finally the art-historical tourism religious and cultural concentrated mostly in mountain villages and historic towns such as l'Aquila, Vasto, Chieti, Teramo, Sulmona and many others.

In January 2016 the online newspaper HuffingtonPost.com has included Abruzzo in its "The World's 12 Best Place to Live or Retire in 2016", writing:

"It's hard to think of a lovelier corner of Italy than the Abruzzo. The beaches are golden, and the sea rolls out like a giant bolt of turquoise silk. There are mountains, too, meaning that, living here, you'd have both skiing and beach-combing on your doorstep, depending on the season. This region is one of Italy's secret treasures" 

In 2022 also american travel magazine Travel + Leisure include Abruzzo in 50 Best Places to Travel in 2022.

In 2021, arrivals were 1,330,887 tourists.

Mountain and ecotourism tourism 

The region currently has 17 active ski resort. They are located in the town of Scanno, Ovindoli, Pescasseroli, Tagliacozzo, Roccaraso, Campo Imperatore, Campo Felice, Rivisondoli, Pescocostanzo and Prati di Tivo where winter tourism is highly developed and then you can play sports such as alpine skiing, snowboarding, ski mountaineering, ski touring, cross-country skiing and dog sledding. Other trails and facilities are in San Giacomo (Valle Castellana), Passolanciano-Majelletta, Prato Selva, Campo Rotondo, Campo di Giove, Passo San Leonardo, Passo Godi, Pizzoferrato and Gamberale.
Abruzzo is called Europe's greenest region and boasts the presence of three national parks (Parco Nazionale d'Abruzzo, Lazio e Molise, Gran Sasso e Monti della Laga National Park, Maiella National Park, and regional park Sirente Velino Regional Park) and 38 protected areas between oasis, regional reserves and state reserves. The parks allow tourists hiking and nature activities, leisure activities and holidays such as excursions to the park, horse riding, hiking, cycling, canoeing, rafting, windsurfing, hiking, birdwatching, boating on Lake of Bomba, activities paragliding and hang-gliding and finally tourism resort on Lake of Scanno and Campotosto, in addition to the natural parks of Abruzzo boasts numerous protected areas.

Unesco site 

In 2017, the ancient beech forests of the Abruzzo Lazio and Molise National Park of Europe were recognized as a World Heritage Site by UNESCO, with the region thus gaining its first prestigious site.

Coastal and Beach tourism 

The coast in Abruzzo extends for 129 kilometers, is nationally known as a tourist bathing resorts Montesilvano, Pineto, Roseto degli Abruzzi, Giulianova, Alba Adriatica, Tortoreto, Francavilla al Mare, Ortona, Vasto, Martinsicuro, Silvi Marina, and finally the Trabocchi Coast is not only famous for the sea but also for the ancient fishing machines Abruzzo still visible and can be visited by tourists along the coast, many of these centers, tourist resorts have the privilege and prestige of being appointed Blue Flag beach for water quality and services. With regard to this type of tourism are many activities that you can do: sailing, windsurfing and kite surfing, canoeing, fishing, boating (including jet skiing and water skiing), fishing and underwater photography, scuba diving, snorkeling, horseback riding, golf, mountain biking, cycling, motorcycle racing, motocross and off-road, kayaking.

Art-historical and religious tourism 

As for the art-historical and religious tourism cultural, historical and cultural importance are the city of Chieti with Roman ruins, churches, museums (Museo archeologico nazionale d'Abruzzo with inside the Warrior of Capestrano, Teramo (Teramo Cathedral), Vasto (Palazzo D'Avalos, Castello Caldonesco), Lanciano (Miracle of Lanciano), Manoppello (Manoppello Image), Ortona (Basilica-Cathedral of St. Thomas the Apostle with the remains of the saint disciple of Jesus), Atri (Basilica di Santa Maria Assunta), Giulianova (Cathedral of San Flaviano), Sulmona (Sulmona Cathedral), l'Aquila (including the famous Basilica of Santa Maria di Collemaggio - with the remains of Pope Celestine V - severely damaged by the earthquake of 2009), (Museo Nazionale d'Abruzzo), Santa Maria del Suffragio, Forte Spagnolo, Fontana delle 99 cannelle), St. Gabriel's shrine with average of 2 million visitors per year is one of the 15 most visited sanctuaries in the world and others small villages with many monuments, museums, castles and churches of national importance; even though a city Pescara modern, has basilicas, shrines, churches and important museums (Basilica della Madonna dei sette dolori, Madonna del Fuoco, Pescara Cathedral, e Museo casa natale Gabriele D'Annunzio).

In the interior mountains are ancient villages included, among other things on the list of I Borghi più belli d'Italia(Abbateggio, Anversa degli Abruzzi, Bugnara, Campli, Caramanico Terme, Casoli, Castel del Monte, Castelli, Città Sant'Angelo, Civitella del Tronto whose fortress is the most visited monument in the whole Abruzzo region, Crecchio, Guardiagrele, Introdacqua, Navelli, Opi, Pacentro, Penne, Pescocostanzo, Pettorano sul Gizio, Pietracamela, Pretoro, Rocca San Giovanni, Santo Stefano di Sessanio, Scanno, Tagliacozzo, Villalago), castles (in Roccascalegna, Celano, Pacentro, Anversa degli Abruzzi, Avezzano, Balsorano, Villalago, Calascio, Valle Castellana, Monteodorisio, Carpineto Sinello, Crecchio, Civitaluparella, Ortona, Castiglione Messer Marino, Civitella Messer Raimondo, Vasto, Palmoli, Serramonacesca, Salle), hermitages (Sant'Onofrio al Morrone, San Giovanni, San Bartolomeo, etc..), sanctuaries Basilica santuario del Volto Santo di Manoppello, Monastero di Santa Maria in Valle Rotana Convents (Convento del Ritiro della Santissima Annunziata del Poggio, Convento della Madonna del Carmine, Convento di San Francesco (Lanciano), Convento Michetti, Ex Convento di San Donato), abbeys (San Clemente a Casauria, San Liberatore a Majella, San Giovanni in Venere, Abbazia Santa Maria in Montesanto, Abbazia di Santa Lucia, Abbazia di Santa Maria Arabona, Badia Morronese), and old churches (Santa Maria ad Cryptas a Fossa, San Tommaso di Caramanico and others).

Food and wine tourism 

The food and wine sector has also been re-evaluated in recent years, with a varied cuisine, which preserves ancient features of the ancient pastoral and mountain and sea recipes, and today offers food and wine products of excellence, among which the Saffron of l'Aquila, the Liquorice of Atri, the Confetti di Sulmona, the Mortadella di Campotosto, the prestigious wine Montepulciano d'Abruzzo and many others.

Places of interest

Parks and protected areas 

 Parco Nazionale d'Abruzzo, Lazio e Molise
 Gran Sasso e Monti della Laga National Park
 Maiella National Park
 Sirente Velino Regional Park
 Bosco di Sant'Antonio - Natural Reserve - Pescocostanzo 
 Chamois Wildlife Area - Pacentro
 Abetina Selva Grande - Castiglione Messer Marino 
 Torre del Cerrano Marine Protected Area
 Del Verde Waterfalls - Borrello
 Zompo Lo Schioppo Waterfalls
 Beechwood in Rosello
 Riserva Naturale Lago di Campotosto - Campotosto
 Regional Nature Reserve of Punta Aderci
Nature Reserve Pineta Dannunziana
Riserva Naturale di Monte Salviano
Monti Simbruini

Ski resort 

Campo di Giove
Cappadocia
Tre Nevi (Campo Felice,Campo Imperatore, Ovindoli)
Alto Sangro (Barrea, Pescasseroli, Pescocostanzo, Rivisondoli, Roccaraso)
Passo Lanciano-La Majelletta ski area (Pretoro, Rapino, Pennapiedimonte, Roccamorice)
Prati di Tivo
Scanno (Monte Rotondo, Passo Godi)
Tagliacozzo
San Giacomo (Valle Castellana) 
Prato Selva
Campo Rotondo
Passo San Leonardo
Passo Godi
Pizzoferrato
Gamberale

Beaches 

 Lidi di Martinsicuro
 Lidi di Alba Adriatica
 Lidi di Tortoreto
 Lidi di Giulianova
 Lidi di Pineto
 Lido e riserva naturale di Torre di Cerrano
 Cologna Spiaggia
 Lidi di Silvi
 Lido di Città Sant'Angelo
 Lido di Montesilvano
 Lidi di Pescara
 Lido di Francavilla al Mare
 Trabocchi Coast
 Ortona - Lido Riccio, Lido Saraceni e Ripari di Giobbe
 Lido "La Foce" di Rocca San Giovanni 
 San Vito Chietino - Punta Cavalluccio
 Lido "Pesca Palombo" di Fossacesia
 Torino di Sangro - Le Morge
 Lidi di Casalbordino
 Vasto - Punta Aderci, Punta Penna e Marina di Vasto
 San Salvo Marina

Lakes 

Lake Campotosto
Lake Barrea
Lago di Bomba
Fucine Lake
Pio Lake
Lago di San Domenico
Lago di Scanno
Lago di Pantaniello - Barrea
Lago di Penne 
Lago di S. Angelo o di Casoli - Casoli
Lago di Secinaro - Secinaro
Lago di Serranella
Lago di Sinizzo - San Demetrio Ne' Vestini
Lago Montagna Spaccata - Alfedena
Pietranzoni lake in Campo Imperatore

Historic cities

L'Aquila
Pescara
Teramo
Chieti
Vasto
Sulmona
Lanciano
Giulianova
Ortona
Penne
Atri
Guardiagrele

I Borghi più belli d'Italia (Ancient villages)https://borghipiubelliditalia.it/en/abruzzo/

Abbateggio
Anversa degli Abruzzi
Bugnara
Campli
Caramanico Terme
Casoli
Castel del Monte
Castelli
Città Sant'Angelo
Civitella del Tronto
Crecchio
Guardiagrele
Navelli
Opi
Pacentro
Penne
Pescocostanzo
Pettorano sul Gizio
Pietracamela
Pretoro
Rocca San Giovanni
Santo Stefano di Sessanio
Scanno
Tagliacozzo
Villalago

Shrines 

Teramo Cathedral
Sulmona Cathedral
Santa Maria di Collemaggio
Pescara Cathedral
Santa Maria del Suffragio
St. Gabriel's shrine

Museums 

Museo Nazionale d'Abruzzo
Basilio Cascella Civic Museum
Imago Museum
Museo Civico di Teramo
Museo d'Arte Moderna Vittoria Colonna
Museo Paparella Treccia Devlet
Taverna ducale, Popoli

Birthplace of Gabriele D'Annunzio Museum
Chieti Museum of Biomedical Sciences
Museo archeologico Francesco Savini
Museo Archeologico Nazionale d'Abruzzo
Museo Archeologico Nazionale di Campli
Museo capitolare di Atri
Museo civico archeologico Antonio De Nino
Museo civico aufidenate
Museo civico aufidenate Antonio De Nino
Museo civico di Cerchio
Museo d'Arte Sacra della Marsica
Museo del duomo di Guardiagrele
Museo delle Genti d'Abruzzo
Museo diocesano di Lanciano
Museo diocesano di Sulmona
Museo Paludi di Celano

Castles 

Castello aragonese (Ortona)
Castello Baglioni
Castle of Barisciano
Palazzo baronale
Castle of Bominaco
Castello Caldora
Castello Caldora, Civitaluparella
Castello Caldoresco
Castel Camponeschi
Cantelmo Castle
Castello Caracciolo
Castello di Carsoli
Castelfraiano

Castle of Rocca Calascio
Fortezza di Civitella del Tronto
Castello ducale di Crecchio
Castello De Sanctis
Castello De Sterlich-Aliprandi
Castello ducale Cantelmo
Castle of Carpineto Sinello
Forte Spagnolo, L'Aquila
Castle of Fossa
Castello Franceschelli
Castello di Gagliano Aterno
Castello di Gamberale

Castello Gizzi
Castel Manfrino
Castello marchesale
Castello Masciantonio
Castello Mediceo
Castel Menardo
Castello di Monteodorisio
Norman Castle (Anversa degli Abruzzi)
Castle of Ocre
Castello di Oricola
Castello Orsini
Orsini-Colonna Castle
Castello di Ortona dei Marsi
Castello di Pereto
Castello Piccolomini (Balsorano)
Castello Piccolomini (Capestrano)

Castello Piccolomini (Celano)
Castello Piccolomini (Ortucchio)
Rocca di Villalago
Rocca Orsini
Castello di Roccascalegna
Castello di Salle
Castle of San Pio delle Camere
Castle of Sant'Eusanio Forconese

Abbeys and Monasteries 

Abbey of San Clemente a Casauria
Abbey of San Clemente al Volmano
San Giovanni in Venere Abbey
San Liberatore a Maiella
Abbey of Santa Lucia
Santa Maria Arabona
Santa Maria di Propezzano
Abbey of the Holy Spirit at Monte Morrone, Sulmona

Hermitages 
Hermitage of Sant'Angelo, Lettomanoppello
Hermitage of Sant'Angelo, Palombaro
Hermitage of Saint Anthony
Hermitage of San Bartolomeo in Legio
Hermitage of San Domenico
Hermitage of Sant'Egidio
Hermitage of San Germano
Hermitage of San Giovanni all'Orfento

Hermitage of Madonna dell'Altare
Hermitage of Madonna di Coccia
Hermitage of Santa Maria del Cauto
Hermitage of San Michele Arcangelo, Pescocostanzo
Hermitage of Sant'Onofrio al Morrone
Hermitage of Sant'Onofrio, Serramonacesca
Rock-cut complex of San Liberatore
Rock-cut tombs of San Liberatore
Hermitage of Santo Spirito a Majella
Hermitage of San Venanzio, Raiano

Archaeological sites 

Alba Fucens
Amiternum
Aufina
Corfinium
Juvanum
Lucus Angitiae
Necropolis of Fossa
Ocriticum
Peltuinum
Shrine of Hercules Curinus
Tunnels of Claudius

Annual Statistics

Gallery

See also 
 Economy of Abruzzo
 Cuisine of Abruzzo
 Tourism in Italy

References

External links

skiabruzzo.com
Abruzzoturismo Official Page

Tourism in Abruzzo
Abruzzo
Tourism in Italy